The defence of the British Virgin Islands is the responsibility of the United Kingdom.  The history of the islands is relatively free from armed conflict, and people of the British Virgin Islands have served in foreign militaries with great distinction.  Foremost amongst these is Samuel Hodge (grandson of notorious historical figure, Arthur William Hodge), who won the Victoria Cross, Britain's highest military honour, whilst serving in the Gambia Campaign for the British Army.

There are neither British Forces nor any military installations based on the islands. The Royal Navy may visit the islands from time to time during defence engagement in the region. Since 2020, the Royal Navy has deployed the offshore patrol vessel HMS Medway in the Caribbean for general patrol duties and for sovereignty protection missions for all British territories in the region.

Virgin Islands Cadet Corps

The island has Army Cadet Corps since 2009, but they are not members of the British Army, but rather a youth organization with ties to the Royal Virgin Islands Police Force and neighbouring Caribbean military and/or cadet organizations.

References